Walther Carl Rudolf Schreiber (10 June 1884 — 30 June 1958) was a German politician who served as the mayor of West Berlin from 1953 to 1955, as a member of the Christian Democratic Union (CDU) Party.

External links

1884 births
1958 deaths
People from Nordhausen (district)
Mayors of West Berlin
Members of the Abgeordnetenhaus of Berlin
Christian Democratic Union of Germany politicians
People from the Province of Saxony
Finance ministers of Prussia
Trade ministers of Prussia
Grand Crosses 1st class of the Order of Merit of the Federal Republic of Germany